Walter Thom (1770–1824) was a Scottish writer and journalist.

Life
He was born at Bervie, Kincardineshire, and later moved to Aberdeen, where he established himself as a bookseller. In 1813 he went to Dublin, as editor of the Dublin Journal, assisted by his son Alexander Thom. He died in there on 16 June 1824.

Works
Thom was the author of a History of Aberdeen (Aberdeen, 1811) and of a treatise on Pedestrianism (Aberdeen, 1813). He also contributed to Brewster's Encyclopædia, to Sir John Sinclair's Statistical Account of Scotland, and to William Shaw Mason's Statistical Account of Ireland.

References

Attribution

1770 births
1824 deaths
19th-century Scottish historians
Scottish journalists
People from Kincardine and Mearns
Scottish booksellers
Scottish editors
Historians of Scotland
Scottish encyclopedists
Scottish statisticians
History of Aberdeen